Because of the size and diversity of the population of Louisville, Kentucky, there are many schools in a number of different school systems, both public and private. This list of schools in Louisville, Kentucky, attempts to list the educational institutions in Louisville, as well as some post-secondary institutions in the surrounding metropolitan area.

Public schools

Private schools

Combined elementary and high schools 

 The Academy for Individual Excellence (Nonsectarian) (PK-12)
 Beth Haven Christian School (Baptist) (PK-12)
 Christian Academy of Louisville (Christian) (K-12)
 Covenant Classical Academy (Christian, Classical) (K-12)
 Evangel Christian School (K-12)
 Families For Christ Christian Academy (Christian) (1-12)
 Highlands Latin School (Christian, Classical) (K-12)
Immaculata Classical Academy  (Catholic, Classical and Inclusive of Children with special needs) (PS3-12)
 Kentucky Country Day School (Nonsectarian) (K-12)
 Landmark Christian Academy (Baptist) (K-12)
 Louisville Adventist Academy (Seventh-day Adventist) (K-12)
 Louisville Classical Academy (Independent, Nonsectarian) (K-12)
 Louisville Collegiate School (Nonsectarian) (PK-12)
 M I C A H School (Baptist) (PK-11)
 Northside Christian School (Baptist) (K-12)
 Nur Islamic School of Louisville (Islamic) (PK-12)
 Pitt Academy (Catholic) (K-12)
 Portland Christian School (Christian) (K-12)
 Sayers Classical Academy (Christian, Classical) (PK-12)
 St. Francis School: Progressive Teaching: Preschool to 12th (Nonsectarian)
 Valor Traditional Academy (Christian) (K-12)
 Walden School (Nonsectarian) (K-12)
 Whitefield Academy (Baptist) (formerly Highview Baptist School) (PK-12)

Elementary schools 

 Ascension Elementary School (Catholic)
 The Chance School (Nonsectarian)
 Community Catholic Elementary School (Catholic)
 The De Paul School (Nonsectarian)
 Eastside Christian Academy (Christian)
 Friends School (Nonsectarian)
 Hayfield Montessori School (Nonsectarian)
 Holy Family Elementary School (Catholic)
 Holy Spirit Elementary School (Catholic)
 Holy Trinity Parish School (Catholic)
 Immaculata Classical Academy (Catholic)
 Louisville Classical Academy (Independent, Nonsectarian)
 Louisville Deaf Oral School (Nonsectarian)
 Meredith-Dunn School (Nonsectarian)
 Emma Minnis SDA School (Seventh-day Adventist)
 Montessori School of Louisville
 Mother of Good Counsel Elementary School (Catholic)
 Notre Dame Academy (Catholic)
 Our Lady of Lourdes Elementary School (Catholic)
 Our Savior Lutheran School (Lutheran)
 Pope John Paul II Academy (Catholic)
 Prospect Latin School (Christian, Private)
 Sacred Heart Model School (Catholic)
 St. Agnes Elementary School (Catholic)
 St. Albert the Great Elementary School (Catholic)
 St. Andrew Academy (Catholic)
 St. Athanasius Elementary School (Catholic)
 St. Bernard Elementary School (Catholic)
 St. Denis Elementary School (Catholic)
 St. Edward Elementary School (Catholic)
 St. Francis of Assisi Elementary School (Catholic)
 St. Francis Goshen Campus Preschool to 8th (Nonsectarian)
 St. Gabriel Elementary School (Catholic)
 St. Helen Elementary School (Catholic)
 St. James Elementary School (Catholic)
 St. Lawrence Elementary School (Catholic)
 St. Leonard Elementary School (Catholic)
 St. Margaret Mary Elementary School (Catholic)
 St. Martha Elementary School (Catholic)
 St. Michael Elementary School (Catholic)
 St. Nicholas Academy (Catholic)
 St. Patrick Elementary School (Catholic)
 St. Paul Elementary School (Catholic)
 St. Raphael Elementary School (Catholic)
 St. Rita Elementary School (Catholic)
 St. Rose Elementary School (Catholic)
 St. Stephen Martyr Elementary School (Catholic)
 Summit Academy Of Greater Louisville (Nonsectarian)
 Thomas Merton Academy (Catholic)
 Waldorf School Of Louisville (Nonsectarian)
 The West End School

High schools 

 Assumption High School (Catholic, female only)
 DeSales High School (Catholic, male only)
 Holy Cross High School (Catholic, co-ed)
 Louisville Classical Academy (Independent, Nonsectarian)
 Mercy Academy (Catholic, female only)
 Presentation Academy (Catholic, female only)
 Sacred Heart Academy (Catholic, female only)
 St. Francis High School (Nonsectarian)
 St. Xavier High School (Catholic, male only)
 Trinity High School  (Catholic, male only)

Colleges and universities

Public institutions ranked by highest degree offered 

 University of Louisville (Highest degree offered is Doctorate)
 Indiana University Southeast (Located in nearby New Albany, Indiana, highest degree offered is Master's Degree)
Purdue University New Albany (Located in nearby New Albany, Indiana, highest degree offered is a Bachelor's Degree)
 Jefferson Community and Technical College (Highest degree offered is Associate's)
 Ivy Tech Community College of Indiana (Located in nearby Sellersburg, Indiana, highest degree offered is Associate's)

Private institutions offering four year (or more) degrees 

 Bellarmine University (Not-for-profit, Catholic)
 Boyce College (Not-for-profit, Baptist)
 Campbellsville University - Louisville (Not-for-profit, Baptist)
 Indiana Wesleyan University (Not-for-profit, Wesleyan, Louisville Campus)
 ITT Technical Institute (For-profit)
 Louisville Bible College (Not-for-profit, Christian Churches/Churches of Christ)
 Louisville Presbyterian Theological Seminary (Not-for-profit, Presbyterian)
 McKendree University (Not-for-profit, Louisville Campus)
 Simmons College of Kentucky (Not-for-profit, HBCU)
 Southern Baptist Theological Seminary (Not-for-profit, Baptist)
 Spalding University (Not-for-profit, Catholic)
 Sullivan University (For-profit)
 Sullivan College of Technology and Design (For-profit)
 University of Phoenix (For-profit, Louisville Campus)
 Webster University (Not-for-profit, Louisville Campus)

Private institutions offering two year degrees 

 Boyce College (Not-for-profit, Baptist)
 Brown Mackie College (For-profit, primary school in Kansas)
 Daymar College (For-profit)
 Galen College of Nursing (For-profit)
 National College of Business and Technology (For-profit)
 Spencerian College (For-profit)
 Empire Beauty School (For-profit)
 Louisville Beauty Academy (For-profit)
 Louisville Institute of Technology (LIT) (For-profit)

See also

External links 
 Archdiocese of Louisville Schools
 Jefferson County Public Schools
 Private School Review website

References 

 
Louisville
Schools